Zlatan Bajramović (born 12 August 1979) is a Bosnian retired professional footballer who played as a defensive midfielder.

Club career
Bajramović spent all of his playing career in the country of his birth, Germany. After starting his career at FC St. Pauli, he moved to SC Freiburg in 2002, then in 2005 to FC Schalke 04. On 30 July 2008, he moved to Eintracht Frankfurt. After numerous injuries, Bajramović retired from professional football in 2011.

International career
Bajramović made his debut for Bosnia and Herzegovina in a March 2002 friendly match against Macedonia and has earned a total of 35 caps, scoring three goals. His final international was a November 2009 FIFA World Cup qualification match against Portugal.

Personal life
His family is from Vitez, Bosnia and Herzegovina.

Honours

SC Freiburg
2. Bundesliga: 2002–03

Schalke 04
DFB-Ligapokal: 2005

References

External links

1979 births
Living people
Footballers from Hamburg
German people of Bosnia and Herzegovina descent
Citizens of Bosnia and Herzegovina through descent
Association football midfielders
Bosnia and Herzegovina footballers
Bosnia and Herzegovina international footballers
FC St. Pauli players
SC Freiburg players
FC Schalke 04 players
Eintracht Frankfurt players
Bundesliga players
2. Bundesliga players
Bosnia and Herzegovina football managers
German football managers
Karlsruher SC managers
3. Liga managers
Bosnia and Herzegovina expatriate footballers
Bosnia and Herzegovina expatriate football managers
Bosnia and Herzegovina expatriate sportspeople in Germany
Expatriate footballers in Germany
Expatriate football managers in Germany